Werner Böttcher (4 September 1909 – 10 November 1944) was a German middle-distance runner. He competed in the men's 1500 metres at the 1936 Summer Olympics. He was killed in action during World War II.

References

1909 births
1944 deaths
Athletes (track and field) at the 1936 Summer Olympics
German male middle-distance runners
Olympic athletes of Germany
Place of birth missing
German military personnel killed in World War II
Missing in action of World War II